Events in the year 2018 in Belarus.

Incumbents
 President: Alexander Lukashenko
 Prime Ministers: Andrei Kobyakov, Syarhey Rumas

Events

February
February 9-25 Belarus took part in the 2018 Winter Olympics in PyeongChang, South Korea.

March
March 9-18: Belarus takes part in the 2018 Winter Paralympics in PyeongChang, South Korea.

Deaths

1 February – Barys Kit, rocket scientist (b. 1910).

6 April – Aleksandr Kurlovich, weightlifter (b. 1961)

10 July – Mikalay Dzyemyantsyey, politician (b. 1930).

References

 
2010s in Belarus
Years of the 21st century in Belarus
Belarus
Belarus